Pseudohypatopa beljaevi is a moth in the family Blastobasidae. It is known from eastern Russia.

References

Natural History Museum Lepidoptera generic names catalog

Blastobasidae